Common names: Uracoan rattlesnake.
Crotalus vegrandis is a venomous pitviper species found only in Venezuela in South America.

Description
Klauber (1997) gives two maximum lengths: 636 mm for the largest measured specimen, and 684 mm as the greatest value from a report believed to be reliable.

Geographic range
Found only in the type locality, which is "Maturín Savannah, near Uracoa, Sotillo District, State of Monagas, Venezuela."

References

External links

 

vegrandis
Snakes of South America
Endemic fauna of Venezuela
Reptiles of Venezuela
Reptiles described in 1941